Holberg may refer to:
 Holberg, British Columbia, a community in British Columbia
 Holberg (crater), a crater on Mercury
 Holberg Suite, a suite of five movements written by Edvard Grieg 
 The Holberg Prize, established by the government of Norway 
 The Holberg Medal, an award to a Danish author of fiction or writer on science

People with the surname
 Brittany Holberg a woman currently on death row in the U.S. state of Texas
 Christen Nielsen Holberg (1625–1686), Norwegian Army officer, father of Ludvig
 Ludvig Holberg (1684–1754), Norwegian-born Danish writer
 Mary Liz Holberg (born 1959), Minnesota politician
 Waldemar Holberg, Danish boxer

it:Holberg